The following is the filmography of American actor, comedian, producer and writer Will Ferrell.

Film

As an actor

As producer

Television

As actor

As executive producer

Music videos

Video games

References

External links
 

Will Ferrell
American filmographies
Male actor filmographies